Dimorphos (formal designation (65803) Didymos I; provisional designation S/2003 (65803) 1) is a natural satellite or moon of the near-Earth asteroid 65803 Didymos, with which it forms a binary system. The moon was discovered on 20 November 2003 by Petr Pravec in collaboration with other astronomers worldwide. Before the impact by DART, Dimorphos had a shape of an oblate spheroid with a surface covered in boulders but virtually no craters. The moon is thought to have formed when Didymos shed its mass due to its rapid rotation, which formed an orbiting ring of debris that conglomerated into a low-density rubble pile that became Dimorphos today.

The DART impact is predicted to have caused global resurfacing and deformation of Dimorphos's shape, leaving an impact crater several tens of meters in diameter. The impact has likely sent Dimorphos into a chaotically tumbling rotation that will subject the moon to irregular tidal forces by Didymos before it will eventually return to a tidally locked state within several decades. The ESA mission Hera is planned to arrive at the Didymos system in 2026 to further study the effects of DART's impact on Dimorphos.

Discovery 

The primary asteroid Didymos was discovered in 1996 by Joe Montani of the Spacewatch Project at the University of Arizona. The satellite Dimorphos was discovered on 20 November 2003, in photometric observations by Petr Pravec and colleagues at the Ondřejov Observatory in the Czech Republic. Dimorphos was detected through periodic dips in Didymos's brightness due to mutual eclipses and occultations. With his collaborators, he confirmed from the Arecibo radar delay-Doppler images that Didymos is a binary system.

Name 
The Working Group for Small Bodies Nomenclature of the International Astronomical Union (IAU) gave the satellite its official name on 23 June 2020. The name Dimorphos is derived from a Greek word meaning 'having two forms'. The justification for the new name reads: "As the target of the DART and Hera space missions, it will become the first celestial body in cosmic history whose form was substantially changed as a result of human intervention (the DART impact)". Prior to the IAU naming, the nickname Didymoon was used in official communications.

Exploration 
On 24 November 2021, NASA and the Applied Physics Laboratory launched an impactor spacecraft towards Dimorphos as part of their Double Asteroid Redirection Test (DART). DART was the first experiment conducted in space to test asteroid deflection as a method of defending Earth from potentially hazardous asteroids. The collision successfully decreased Dimorphos's orbital period around Didymos by  minutes. Fifteen days prior to its collision, the impactor released LICIACube, a 6U CubeSat operated by the Italian Space Agency that photographed the impact and the resulting dust plume as it performed a close flyby of the Didymos system. Spacecraft and observatories such as Hubble, James Webb, Lucy, SAAO and ATLAS also captured the dust plume trailing the Didymos system in the days following the impact. As part of its Hera mission, ESA currently plans to launch three spacecraft to the Didymos system in 2024 to further study the aftermath of the impact.

The DART impact on the center of Dimorphos decreased the orbital period, previously 11.92 hours, by 33±1 minutes. This large change indicates the recoil from material excavated from the asteroid and ejected into space by the impact (known as ejecta) contributed significant momentum change to the asteroid, beyond that of the DART spacecraft itself. Researchers found the impact caused an instantaneous slowing in Dimorphos' speed along its orbit of about 2.7 millimeters per second — again indicating the recoil from ejecta played a major role in amplifying the momentum change directly imparted to the asteroid by the spacecraft. That momentum change was amplified by a factor of 2.2 to 4.9 (depending on the mass of Dimorphos), indicating the momentum change transferred because of ejecta production significantly exceeded the momentum change from the DART spacecraft alone. While the orbital change was small, the change is in the velocity and over the course of years will accumulate to a large change in position. For a hypothetical Earth-threatening body, even such a tiny change could be sufficient to mitigate or prevent an impact, if applied early enough. As the diameter of Earth is around 13,000 kilometers, a hypothetical asteroid impact could be avoided with as little of a shift as half of that (6,500 kilometers). A  velocity change accumulates to that distance in approximately 10 years.

By smashing into the asteroid DART made Dimorphos an active asteroid. Scientists had proposed that some active asteroids are the result of impact events, but no one had ever observed the activation of an asteroid. The DART mission activated Dimorphos under precisely known and carefully observed impact conditions, enabling the detailed study of the formation of an active asteroid for the first time. Observations show that Dimorphos lost approximately 1 million kilograms after the collision. Impact produced a dust plume that temporarily brightened the Didymos system and developed a -long dust tail that persisted for several months. The DART impact is predicted to have caused global resurfacing and deformation of Dimorphos's shape, leaving an impact crater several tens of meters in diameter. The impact has likely sent Dimorphos into a chaotically tumbling rotation that will subject the moon to irregular tidal forces by Didymos before it will eventually return to a tidally locked state within several decades.

Size and shape 
Dimorphos does not have a confirmed mass, but it is estimated to be about  (5.5 million tons), or about the same mass and size as the Great Pyramid of Giza, when assuming a density of  similar to Didymos. It is one of the smallest celestial objects given a formal name by the IAU, after 367943 Duende and 469219 Kamoʻoalewa.

The final few minutes of pictures from the DART mission revealed an egg-shaped body covered with boulders, suggesting it has a rubble pile structure.

Surface 

Five boulders (saxa) have been given names of traditional drums from several cultures. They are approximately 10 meters across or smaller:

Orbit and rotation 

The primary body of the binary system, Didymos, orbits the Sun at a distance of 1.0 to 2.3 AU once every 770 days (2 years and 1 month). The pathway of the orbit has an eccentricity of 0.38 and an inclination of 3° with respect to the ecliptic. Dimorphos moves in a nearly equatorial, nearly circular orbit around Didymos, with an orbital period of 11.9 hours. Its orbit period is synchronous with its rotation, so that the same side of Dimorphos always faces Didymos. Dimorphos's orbit is retrograde relative to the ecliptic plane, in conformity with Didymos's retrograde rotation. 

Dimorphos's rotation is being slowed down by the YORP effect, with an estimated rotation period doubling time of 86,000 years. However, because it is in orbit around Didymos, tidal forces keep the moon locked in synchronous rotation.

See also 
 354P/LINEAR – a main-belt asteroid that was naturally impacted by another asteroid sometime before 2010
 P/2016 G1 (PanSTARRS) – another main-belt asteroid that was impacted by an asteroid in 2016

Footnotes

References

External links 
 

Asteroid satellites
Named minor planets
Radar-imaged asteroids
Active asteroids
Astronomical objects discovered in 2003
Minor planets visited by spacecraft